This is a list of the Tributaries of the Niger River. They are listed by nation, at the point they converge into the Niger.

Benin

Alibori River

Burkina Faso
Sirba River

Guinea
Tinkisso River 
Milo River
Niandan River

Mali
Sankarani River
Bani River

Niger
Mekrou River

Nigeria

Sokoto River
Kaduna River
Benue River
Forcados River
Nun River

References
R.L. Welcomme. The Niger River System. in Bryan Robert Davies, Keith F. Walker (eds) The Ecology of River Systems. Springer, (1986)  pp. 9–60

Niger
Niger
Niger
Niger
Niger
Niger
Main